The first season of American Gods, based on Neil Gaiman's novel of the same name, was broadcast on Starz between April 30, 2017, and June 18, 2017, and consisted of eight episodes. Bryan Fuller and Michael Green adapted the first season, serving as showrunners, and production began in March 2016 after the series was officially greenlit in March 2015. The season stars Ricky Whittle, Emily Browning, Crispin Glover, Bruce Langley, Yetide Badaki, Pablo Schreiber and Ian McShane.

The season follows Shadow Moon after he's released from prison following the death of his wife, when he meets Mr. Wednesday, an Old God who is in the midst of a war between the Old Gods, the gods from ancient mythology, and the New Gods, the gods of society, technology, and globalization. The season received positive reviews from critics.

Cast and characters

Main
 Ricky Whittle as Shadow Moon, a former convict who becomes Mr. Wednesday's bodyguard.
 Emily Browning as Laura Moon, Shadow Moon's wife and a revenant. Browning also portrays Essie MacGowan, the Irish woman whose belief in leprechauns changes the course of her life.
 Crispin Glover as Mr. World, the New God of globalization and the leader of the New Gods.
 Bruce Langley as the Technical Boy, the New God of technology.
 Yetide Badaki as Bilquis, a goddess of love, identified with the Queen of Sheba.
 Pablo Schreiber as Mad Sweeney, a leprechaun in the employ of Mr. Wednesday who has trouble coming to terms with his lost charm.
 Ian McShane as Mr. Wednesday, a con artist and the god Odin.

Recurring
 Gillian Anderson as the New Goddess Media, the public face and "mouthpiece" of the New Gods. She appears in the form of famous personalities, including Lucy Ricardo, Marilyn Monroe, David Bowie and Judy Garland. After Anderson's departure from the series, for the second season the role was redefined and renamed as New Media, played by South Korean actress Kahyun Kim (see below).
 Cloris Leachman as Zorya Vechernyaya, "the Evening Star", the eldest of three sisters who watch the stars to guard against forgotten horrors.
 Peter Stormare as Czernobog, Slavic god of darkness, death and evil who suspects Mr. Wednesday's motives and is reluctant to lend his aid.
 Chris Obi as Mr. Jacquel, the Egyptian God of the dead, Anubis.
 Mousa Kraish as the Jinn, a mythic being of fire who, fearing for his safety, considers fleeing the United States.
 Omid Abtahi as Salim, a foreigner who is "one half of a pair of star-crossed lovers". He has a sexual encounter with the Jinn, disguised then as a cab driver.
 Orlando Jones as Mr. Nancy, the Ghanaian trickster god Anansi. He works as a tailor.
 Demore Barnes as Mr. Ibis, the keeper of stories past and present, the Egyptian god Thoth.
 Betty Gilpin as Audrey, Robbie's wife and Laura's best friend.
 Beth Grant as Jack, the owner of the bar where Shadow meets Mr. Wednesday.

Guests
 Jonathan Tucker as Low Key Lyesmith, a friend of Shadow from prison.
 Martha Kelly as Zorya Utrennyaya, "the Morning Star", the middle silent sister of the Zorya.
 Erika Kaar as Zorya Polunochnaya, "the Midnight Star", the youngest of the Zorya sisters who sleeps during the day and only appears late at night. She guides Shadow and sets him on his path.
 Dane Cook as Robbie, Shadow's best friend.
 Kristin Chenoweth as Easter, Germanic goddess of the dawn.
 Corbin Bernsen as Vulcan, who has renewed himself by binding himself to guns and those who worship them.
 Jeremy Davies as Jesus Prime, one of many versions to appear at the home of Easter.
 Conphidance as Okoye, a scarred slave who leads a revolt.

Episodes

Production

Development

In February 2014, Fremantle Media acquired the rights to adapt the novel as a fantasy drama series. In July 2014, it was announced that Starz would be developing the series with Bryan Fuller and Michael Green. Fuller stated that the series would be "[following] the events of the books but expanding those events, and expanding the point of view to go above and beyond Shadow and Wednesday". Permission has been given for the series to incorporate elements from the book's companion, Anansi Boys.  Fuller also confirmed that Gaiman is "very involved" with the production and expressed his hope that Gaiman would write an episode himself.

On June 16, 2015, Starz officially announced that it had greenlit the series. Showrunner Bryan Fuller estimated in May 2015 that the show would likely air in "late 2016"; however, it premiered in April 2017, and the first season consisted of eight episodes. The first season was initially set to consist of ten episodes.

Filming
Production began in March 2016, with filming primarily occurring in Toronto, as well as Brantford, Cambridge, Guelph, and Hamilton, Ontario, and Oklahoma.

Writing
Regarding the sexual content on the show, Green stated that while the book contains sexual content, "our sexual content, when it was portrayed, was artful. By that, we mean that it was essential to character, or essential to story. That it was as beautiful [as] anything else we were gonna try to portray in the show. Which is to say, if you're going to define gratuitous sexuality as sexuality that can be cut out and not diminish the final episode in any way, we weren't gonna do that. We wanted it to be something that was essential." He also added that Starz wasn't "shy about nudity".

The third episode features a gay scene between a businessman named Salim and a Djinn. Fuller admitted he wasn't concerned with the explicit sexual content that was featured in the scene, stating: "We wanted to tell a very graphic story with the sex and sexuality. And also tell a tale where a man comes from a country where homosexuality is punishable by death. For him most sexual experiences [would be] back-alley blowjobs, so the Jinn is making love to him probably for the first time in his life so he can experience sexual love. It's an amazing, beautiful experience for a human being to have particularly when you consider how many men, women and genders in-between, don't, or can't, because of where they come from." Omid Abtahi, who portrays Salim, commented on the relationship, "I think love in any form, man/man, woman/man, woman/woman, whatever, is a beautiful thing. I would love to live in a world where people are not thrown off by that. So the way you do it is by exposing them to it, and normalizing it. Yes, it might be a little graphic for some people but it's natural. There's no hate. We're not trying to offend anybody. It's love." Fuller also demanded a reshoot of the scene, claiming the original sex positions weren't physiologically possible for anal intercourse.

The fifth episode's prologue showed a five-minute animation sequence that revolves around characters in the Ice Age. The sequence was created by Tendril, a design and animation studio that was based near Toronto, where the series is filmed. According to Tendril's director Chris Bahry, the sequence was difficult to make and it took six months to complete. According to Bahry, "The challenge was in finding the most powerful way to communicate the central theme of the sequence: faith vs survival and adaptation." He also added, "We wanted it to feel very tangible and real, like a stop motion film that could have been made by these ancient people, using whatever materials and tools they would have had access to."

Casting
On January 28, 2016, Ricky Whittle was cast as the lead character, Shadow Moon. On March 2, 2016, it was announced that Ian McShane had been cast as Mr. Wednesday. It was later announced on March 17, 2016, that Emily Browning would play Laura Moon, Shadow's wife. On March 23, 2016, it was announced that Sean Harris, Yetide Badaki and Bruce Langley would play the respective roles of Mad Sweeney, Bilquis and Technical Boy. On April 14, 2016, Jonathan Tucker and Crispin Glover were cast as Low Key Lyesmith and Mr. World. On April 21, 2016, Cloris Leachman was cast as Zorya Vechernyaya, Peter Stormare as Czernobog, Chris Obi as Mr. Jaquel, and Mousa Kraish as the Jinn.

On May 6, 2016, it was announced that Sean Harris had departed the series due to personal reasons and the role of Mad Sweeney was being recast. On May 11, 2016, it was announced that Pablo Schreiber would take over the role of Mad Sweeney. In June 2016, it was announced that Gillian Anderson would portray Media. On June 15, 2016, it was announced that Omid Abtahi, Orlando Jones and Demore Barnes would join the cast as Salim, Mr. Nancy and Mr. Ibis, respectively. On July 15, 2016, it was announced that Dane Cook was set to appear as Robbie, and a week later, Kristin Chenoweth as Easter.

Reception

Critical response

The first season of American Gods has received largely positive reviews from critics. On Rotten Tomatoes, it has a 92% rating with an average score of 8.12 out of 10 based on 83 reviews with the consensus stating: "American Gods opens with a series of wildly ambitious gambits – and rewards viewers' faith with a promising first season whose visual riches are matched by its narrative impact." On Metacritic, it has a score of 77 out of 100 based on 36 reviews, indicating "generally favorable reviews". Matt Zoller Seitz, writing for New York Magazine, called the show "a bizarre, dazzling show."

Ratings

Home media 
The first season of American Gods was released on DVD and Blu-ray in Region 4 on July 19, 2017, and in Region 2 on July 31, 2017. The season was released in Region 1 on October 17, 2017, including over two hours of exclusive extras.

References

External links
 
 

2017 American television seasons
American Gods (TV series)